Mézeray may refer to:

 François-Eudes de Mézeray (1610-1683), French historian
 Mézeray, Sarthe, a commune of the Sarthe département in France

See also
 Mazeray, a commune in the Charente-Maritime department in southwestern France